Kontra Channel is a Greek private regional television station based in Tavros. It broadcasts terrestrially digitally from 13 broadcasting centers in Attica and Euboea and via satellite through NOVA subscription platform.

History
The station started operating in 1994 under the name TeleFOS and was basically the first in Greece with shows around ecology, healthy lifestyle and alternative medicine. On September 13, 2010 it was renamed Kontra Channel due to a change in ownership.

Ownership
From the beginning and for a decade, he belonged to the limited liability company Konstantinos Papanikolas and Sia in which the shareholder was the founder of the station Costas Papanikolas, who is also president of the party Ecologists of Greece while previously he was a candidate for the Popular Orthodox Rally in the 2009 Greek legislative election.

On February 6, 2004, Bio-rescue Broadcasting and Ecological S.A. was established, with the distinctive title Telefos - Nea Zoi which re-took over the channel, with its founder taking over as chairman and CEO. A few months later, its statute was modified, with the expansion of activities.

In the middle of 2010, journalist George Kouris acquires 75% of the television station whose operator gets its current name as Kontra Media S.A.

References

External links

Greek-language television stations
Television channels and stations established in 2010
Television channels in Greece